American Township is one of the twelve townships of Allen County, Ohio, United States. The 2010 census found 14,381 people in the township (exclusive of Lima), 12,476 of whom lived in the unincorporated portions of the township.

Geography
Located in the center of the county, it borders the following townships:
Sugar Creek Township - north
Bath Township - east
Perry Township - southeastern corner
Shawnee Township - south
Amanda Township - southwest
Marion Township - northwest

Two municipalities are located in American Township: the village of Elida in the northwest, and part of the city of Lima, the county seat of Allen County, in the southeast.

Name and history
It is the only American Township statewide. American Township was named German Township until 1918 when the township's citizens successfully petitioned for the name change, due to the sinking of the Lusitania. The petition cited Anti-German sentiment as the primary reason for the request.

Government
The township is governed by a three-member board of trustees, who are elected in November of odd-numbered years to a four-year term beginning on the following January 1. Two are elected in the year after the presidential election and one is elected in the year before it. There is also an elected township fiscal officer, who serves a four-year term beginning on April 1 of the year after the election, which is held in November of the year before the presidential election. Vacancies in the fiscal officership or on the board of trustees are filled by the remaining trustees.

References

External links
American Township official website
Allen County website

Townships in Allen County, Ohio
1918 establishments in Ohio
Townships in Ohio